Verbov may refer to:

Surname

 Aleksey Verbov - Russian volleyball player, a member of Russia men's national volleyball team and Russian club Zenit Kazan.
 Gregory Verbov - Soviet ethnographer, linguist

Places

 Verbov (Belarus) - Settlement of Dobrush district of Gomel Region, Belarus